Doyle Orange (born August 6, 1951) is a former all-star running back in the CFL for the Toronto Argonauts.

Having played college football with the Southern Miss Golden Eagles, Orange was drafted by the Atlanta Falcons, but came to Canada in 1974. He rushed for 870 yards in his first season, and was the Argos second 1,000-yard rusher in 1975, with 1134 yards (Hall of Famer Bill Symons was first). He was named an all-star, and on August 13, against the Hamilton Tiger-Cats, he rushed a league record 37 times (for 175 yards). He was injured in 1976, rushing for only 101 yards in 2 games, and finished his career in Hamilton, where he played 8 games and rushed for 380 yards. He played 31 regular season games for the Boatmen. He rushed for 2406 yards in four seasons.

Orange settled in Toronto and works for the City of Toronto Parks and Recreation Department.

Notes

1951 births
Living people
African-American players of Canadian football
Canadian football running backs
Hamilton Tiger-Cats players
People from Waycross, Georgia
Southern Miss Golden Eagles football players
Toronto Argonauts players
University of Southern Mississippi alumni
21st-century African-American people
20th-century African-American sportspeople